Paulo José Ferreira dos Santos (born 11 May 1962 in Vialonga) was a Portuguese professional road bicycle racer. In 1984, Ferreira achieved his greatest victory by winning stage 5 of 1984 Tour de France.

Major results

1982
Volta dos Sete-Marinha Grande
1983
Volta ao Alentejo
1984
Tour de France:
Winner stage 5
1985
Rio Maior
1986
Circuito de Setubal
1987
Circuito da Malveira
1988
Prix Brigada de Transito
1990
Classica de Charneca
1991
Circuito dos Campeões
1994
Porto – Lisboa

External links 

Official Tour de France results for Paulo Ferreira (cyclist)

Portuguese male cyclists
1962 births
Living people
Portuguese Tour de France stage winners
People from Vila Franca de Xira
Sportspeople from Lisbon District